petkey is a pet recovery service based in the United States, available in North America. It is the largest non microchip manufacturer owned pet recovery service. Upon enrollment, a pet's information is documented including the pet's photograph, description and emergency contact information. If the pet has a microchip implant, that number is also documented. When a registered pet is lost or stolen the service sends a bulletin to members, shelter groups, veterinary clinics, trainers, pet supply retailers, and grooming shops in a  radius of the pet's last known location.

References

External links

Identification of domesticated animals